Abada may refer to:
 Abada (surname), a French surname
 Abada (rhinoceros), a rhinoceros kept by Philip II of Spain
 Abada (unicorn), a type of unicorn reported to live in the lands of the African Congo
 Äbädä, a forest spirit in  Tatar mythology
 Abadá, the pants worn by capoeiristas
 ABADÁ-Capoeira, a non-profit organization whose purpose is to spread and support Brazilian culture through the practice of Capoeira
Tell Abada, an archaeological site in Iraq

See also
 Aba (disambiguation)
 Abadan (disambiguation)
 Abaddon (disambiguation)
 Abaya, type of clothing